Floyd Domino is an American musician known for his work in the genre of Western swing.

Biography 

Born a native of California, Domino was introduced to Western swing by way of the musicians who had migrated from Texas and Oklahoma in the 1930s and 1940s.  Floyd's close association with Western swing coincided with joining Asleep at the Wheel at the age of 19.  After 7 years with Asleep at the Wheel, he is now an "AATW Alumnus" who still joins them for featured performances.  While Floyd is widely recognized for his years with Asleep at the Wheel and the revival of Western swing, Floyd began his career with a broad grounding in jazz, boogie-woogie, swing and blues piano.  He regularly performs as Floyd Domino Jazz Trio showcasing a unique blend of jazz and blues.  Other performances include work with Willie Nelson, Merle Haggard, George Strait, The Texas Playboys, Waylon Jennings, jazz guitarist Herb Ellis, Kelly Willis, Bruce Robison, Monte Warden, Don Walser, jazz vocalist Donna Hightower, and the Crickets.

In addition to a career encompassing live performances, recording (both solo and with a host of legendary performers), Floyd has contributed to promoting American roots music through his appearances at schools, camps and other learning organizations.  Between his touring, recording and major performances, Floyd plays clubs, private events and contributes his talents to further roots music appreciation

Awards list 
1978 Grammy : Count Basie's One O'Clock Jump Asleep at the Wheel (Instrumental) 
2000 Top Ten Austin Theatre Critics' Table Award for Musical Direction The Best Little Whorehouse in Texas (Austin Stages)   
2000 Grammy: Best Country Instrumental Featured Artist with Asleep at the Wheel Bob's Breakdown Asleep at the Wheel 's recording Ride With Bob 
2002 "Instrumentalist of the Year" Academy of Western Artists Will Rogers Award (2002 
2004 Cowtown Society of Western Music (2004 "Heroes of Western Music"" Living Hero Floyd Domino 
2006 Top Ten Austin Best Keyboards Award 
2007 Top Ten Austin Best Keyboards Award 
2008 Top Ten Austin Best Keyboards Award 
2009 Top Ten Austin Best Keyboards Award 
2009 Austin Best Keyboards Award 
2017 Inductee, Texas Music Legends Hall of Fame

CD list 
Appearing on over 50 top CDs  plus 5 foreign releases 

Appears on [Imports]

Children's music

Musical direction 
Musical Director, Austin: Best Little Whorehouse in Texas

References

External links 

American country pianists
American male pianists
Asleep at the Wheel members
Living people
21st-century American pianists
21st-century American male musicians
Year of birth missing (living people)
The Strangers (American band) members